According to a 1998 law of the Republic of Belarus, there are three categories of urban-type settlements in Belarus:

Urban settlements (Belarusian: ,): with population over 2,000, industrial enterprises and developed residential infrastructure
Resort settlements (Belarusian: , Russian: , resort towns): with population of at least 2,000, sanatoriums, resorts or other health recuperation establishments, and developed residential infrastructure
Worker settlements (Belarusian: ,): with population at least 500, servicing industrial enterprises, construction sites, railroad stations, electric stations, or other industrial objects.

The notion of urban-type settlement is inherited from the times of Belarusian SSR within the Soviet Union.

List of urban-type settlements 
As of October 14, 2009 (census), there were 94 urban-type settlements, including 83 urban settlements, one resort settlement, and ten worker settlements.

As of January 1, 2016, there were already 90 urban-type settlements, including 81 urban settlements, one resort settlement and eight worker settlements.

External links 
 The Roman alphabet transliteration of Belarusian geographical names

References